The 1998 National Hockey League All-Star Game took place at General Motors Place in Vancouver, home to the Vancouver Canucks, on January 18, 1998.

The International Showdown
The 48th game was held in the very same year as the 1998 Winter Olympics in Nagano, providing the NHL to show its players from all over the world. To this extent, the NHL had the all-star teams consist of a team of North Americans playing against a team of stars from the rest of the world. These provisions only applied to the players – coaches were still  selected based on which teams were the best from each conference at the time of the break.  This was the last All-Star Game to feature Honorary Captains and Commissioner's Selections system that began in the 1985 and 1991 games respectively.

The Canadian Hockey Association took the all-star weekend as a way of assembling their team as a tuneup for the Olympics by inviting all 23 of its players and immersing them in what they would see at the Olympics. As the 1998 Olympics also featured the first-ever Olympic women's hockey tournament, an exhibition game between the Canadian national women's hockey team and the American national women's hockey team was also scheduled as part of the all-star festivities. 14,000 people watched the game, making it the highest attended women's hockey game in the sport's history to that time.

The weekend also saw its usual share of radical ideas and for various hockey persons to vent out their frustrations: most notably, Bob Clarke used it as a way of trying to convince others not to use the neutral zone trap, a system of defensive play. As the NHL was being outclassed in terms of revenue by other major sports, some such as Bob Gainey also proposed to change the rules so that a game consisted of four 15-minute quarters rather than three 20-minute periods, an idea that proved unpopular. Others vented their frustrations about the poor ice quality found in certain arenas, especially in the South, where the ice could melt easily.

Super Skills Competition
The World All-Stars won the first Super Skills Competition in the new International All-Star format.  In the individual events Ray Bourque, Peter Forsberg and Brendan Shanahan would share the victory in the Accuracy Shooting event.  Al MacInnis won his second-straight and fourth all-time Hardest Shot event, while Dominik Hasek won his second Goaltenders Competition.

Individual Event winners
 Puck Control Relay – Teemu Selanne (Mighty Ducks of Anaheim)
 Fastest Skater – Scott Niedermayer (New Jersey Devils) – 13.560 seconds
 Accuracy Shooting – Ray Bourque (Boston Bruins)/Peter Forsberg (Colorado Avalanche)/Brendan Shanahan (Detroit Red Wings) – 4 hits, 6 shots
 Hardest Shot – Al MacInnis (St. Louis Blues) – 100.4 mph
 Goaltenders Competition - Dominik Hasek (Buffalo Sabres) - 3 GA, 16 shots

Uniforms
Prior to the start of the 1997–98 season, the NHL changed its conference logos, replacing the teal and purple previously used by the Eastern and Western Conferences with burgundy and dark blue. Although the All-Star Game would not use a conference format, the uniform colors reflected the updated conference colors - which were similar to the changes in colors made by the host Canucks. The North American team wore burgundy uniforms with white and silver trim, while the World team wore white uniforms with blue and silver trim. Both jerseys featured diagonal striping on the body and sleeves, resembling a stylized spotlight design. The NHL shield featured on the front of the jerseys was rendered in black with silver accents instead of the usual orange, the beginning of a trend that would culminate in the redesign of the shield in 2005.

Following from the previous uniform design, players wore the All-Star Game patch on their right shoulder, and their team logo on their left shoulder. In addition, to mark the new international format of the game, players wore the flag of their country of origin on their right upper chest. The uniform design would be used again in the next All-Star Game in Tampa.

The game
The North America All-Stars overcame a 3–0 deficit to the World All-Stars, setting the stage for the largest comeback victory in All-Star Game history in the first International showdown. Prior to the 1998 Game, no team had come back from a three-goal deficit to win. Mighty Ducks of Anaheim right winger Teemu Selanne recorded a hat-trick to become the first European player to be named All-Star MVP. Selanne also became the first player from a losing squad to receive the honour since Grant Fuhr accomplished that feat at the 1986 NHL All-Star Game.

Boxscore

Referee: Paul Stewart
Linesmen: Mike Cvik, Shane Heyer
Television: Fox, CBC, SRC

See also
1997–98 NHL season

References

All-Star Game
National Hockey League All-Star Games
Ice hockey competitions in Vancouver
1990s in Vancouver
January 1998 sports events in Canada